Wipeout was a British television quiz show for BBC One, based on the original American programme of the same name. First shown on 25 May 1994, it ran for nine series: the first four of which aired at primetime and were hosted by Paul Daniels; and the last five at daytime and hosted by Bob Monkhouse, with the final episode airing on 17 April 2003, 8 months before Monkhouse died on 29 December 2003.

Format
During the game, correct answers would be replaced by a golden star on a black circle, whereas "wipeouts" (wrong answers) would be replaced by the blue and yellow Wipeout "W". This was used in the Daniels version. In the Monkhouse version, green ticks were used for correct answers and red Xs for wipeouts.

Three boards were played in Round 1, with £10 awarded for the first answer plus an additional £10 for each subsequent correct answer (up to £110 for the eleventh). In the Monkhouse version, only two boards were played and each correct answer was worth £50. Any contestant who hit a Wipeout in Round 1 lost all money they had accumulated to that point.

In Round 1 on the first four series, each of the three boards featured a mystery prize hidden behind any one answer. The prize would be determined based on whether it was hidden behind a correct answer or a Wipeout. If it was hidden behind a Wipeout, the player was awarded a cheap prize, usually one to do with the answer (e.g. a can of oil and a lollipop). If it was hidden behind a correct answer, the player was awarded a much better prize (e.g. designer handbags). The contestant who revealed the prize kept it regardless of the game's outcome.

A tiebreaker was not played at the end of Round 1 should a tie present itself. Instead, the player to proceed was the one who had given the most correct answers up to that point. If this was also tied, the player with the fewest wipeouts was accepted into Round 2.

Round 2 was known as "Wipeout Auction". The contestants would be offered a subject, and twelve possible answers on the grid. Eight of these would be correct, and four of these would be Wipeouts. The contestant with the highest amount of money would have the opportunity to bid first on how many correct answers they think they could find in the grid, or to pass the opening bid onto their opponent. Whoever offered the highest bid was given the opportunity to choose that number of answers. The player remained in control until they had achieved the number of correct answers with which they won the bid, or until they hit a Wipeout. If they hit a Wipeout, the opposing player would only have to get one answer right to head into the next round; play switches back to the first player if the second player also discovers a Wipeout. The first player to win two boards went through.

Round 3 was known as "The bonus round" (called "The Monkhouse Minute", with the main button the contestant had to hit "Bob's Button" during the second era) was exactly the same as in America, except that the contestant pressed a button attached to the monitor they wished to activate (in the Daniels version, answers were entered on an oversized keypad). Victory awarded a holiday to a specific location, which changed on occasion. This round was like one of the famous games in The Price Is Right the Race Game where the contestant had to select six answers and run and hit a button which would then show on the screen how many correct answers he or she had selected. The contestant kept doing this until either the time had run out or they found all six correct answers. Daniels did the running on the contestant's behalf on several occasions such as once when they had a wheelchair-bound winner and another when the winner was pregnant and therefore preferred not to risk running. The contestants were told in advance where the holiday would be in the Daniels era, but when Monkhouse took over they could choose where they wanted to go provided that it was within Europe.

Transmissions

Series

Specials
Celebrity specials were aired from 1998 to 2000.

References

External links
.
Wipeout at BFI.
.

1994 British television series debuts
2003 British television series endings
1990s British game shows
2000s British game shows
BBC television game shows
British television series based on American television series
English-language television shows